Pachydactylus formosus, also known as Smith's thick-toed gecko, southern rough gecko or Karoo gecko, is a species of lizard in the family Gekkonidae. It is found in South Africa,  Namibia, and Botswana.

References

Pachydactylus
Reptiles described in 1849
Reptiles of South Africa
Reptiles of Namibia
Reptiles of Botswana